Graham René Paul (born 15 May 1947) is a retired British international fencer.

Fencing career
He competed at the 1968, 1972, 1976, and 1984 Summer Olympics. 

He represented England and won a gold medal in the team foil and a bronze medal in the individual foil, at the 1966 British Empire and Commonwealth Games in Kingston, Jamaica. Four years later he repeated the success by winning another gold and bronze at the 1970 British Commonwealth Games in Edinburgh, Scotland.

He was a six times British fencing champion, winning four foil titles and two épée titles at the British Fencing Championships, from 1966 to 1973. Additionally he has been British Veterans Foil champion seven times.

Personal life
He is part of a famous fencing and athletics family; parents René Paul and June Foulds, brother Barry Paul, uncle Raymond Paul and cousin Steven Paul.

References

External links
 

1947 births
Living people
British male fencers
Olympic fencers of Great Britain
Fencers at the 1968 Summer Olympics
Fencers at the 1972 Summer Olympics
Fencers at the 1976 Summer Olympics
Fencers at the 1984 Summer Olympics
People from St Neots
Commonwealth Games medallists in fencing
Commonwealth Games gold medallists for England
Commonwealth Games bronze medallists for England
Fencers at the 1966 British Empire and Commonwealth Games
Fencers at the 1970 British Commonwealth Games
Medallists at the 1966 British Empire and Commonwealth Games
Medallists at the 1970 British Commonwealth Games